Tilda is the brand name used since 1970 for a rice and related food products company now headquartered in Rainham, England and with offices in Dubai, (UAE) and Delhi (India).

Its basmati rice is the top-selling rice in the United Kingdom. Since 1994, they have operated Tilda Foodservice, providing professional kitchens with a variety of uncooked dry and frozen rice products. The brand is now over 50 years old, selling a variety of product and not just their basmati rice but other varieties of dry rice, microwave convenience rice as well as a range of rice suitable for children.

The company was purchased in 2014 by US group Hain Celestial. Hain Celestial Group sold the company to Spanish group Ebro Foods in August 2019.

References

External links
 Tilda Website

Rice
Food manufacturers based in London
Companies based in the London Borough of Havering
Port of London
Industry on the River Thames